Richard Devereux may refer to:
 Richard Devereux (cricketer), English cricketer
 Richard Devereux (died 1547), political figure during the reign of Henry VIII and Edward VI
 Richard Joseph Devereux (1829–1883), Irish politician

See also
 Richard Devereaux, politician and official in Newfoundland
 Richard T. Devereaux, US Air Force general